Scotty Thurman (born November 10, 1974) is an American former professional basketball player and current assistant coach, perhaps best known as the Arkansas Razorbacks' shooting guard who hit the high-arcing go-ahead three-pointer with 50.7 seconds left in the 1994 NCAA Basketball Championship game, helping to secure Arkansas' only national title to date in a 76–72 victory over the Duke Blue Devils. That shot is referred to as the "Shot heard 'round Arkansas".

College career
Thurman was named to the SEC All-Freshman Team in 1993, and was First Team All-SEC in 1994 and 1995. He also received some All-American recognition from the Associated Press and the Basketball Times in 1994 and 1995. Most Razorback fans consider him to be one of the greatest players in school history. His nickname was the "Ruston Rifle", making reference to Thurman's hometown, and his shooting prowess.

After leading Arkansas to the National Championship game in 1995, Thurman, along with teammate and future NBA player Corliss Williamson, left college early to make himself available for the 1995 NBA draft. His agent and coach had told him that he would be a first round pick, and many fans and analysts agreed with this; surprisingly, he was not drafted. He tried out unsuccessfully with the New Jersey Nets before settling with the CBA's Shreveport Storm (now defunct) in 1995–96.

Professional career
While not making the NBA, Thurman played pro basketball in foreign countries including Cyprus, Greece, Lebanon and Macedonia, and played for the ABA's professional Arkansas RimRockers in their inaugural season. In 2005, Thurman was with Fastlink of the Jordanian basketball league. Prior to that, he was signed with Riyadi Beirut of the Lebanese league. He is considered the best foreign player of all time in the Macedonian Basketball League.

Coaching career
Thurman developed a business career with Russ Phillips. He was the director of real estate for Cypress Properties, Inc., in Little Rock. Thurman was named the Director of Student-Athlete Development for men's basketball at the University of Arkansas, and was also the color analyst for the radio broadcasts of Razorback games. In April 2016, Thurman was named an assistant head coach for the Razorbacks by head coach Mike Anderson. Anderson was fired by the university after the 2018–19 season, and Thurman was not retained by the new head coach, Eric Musselman.

References

External links
Eurobasket.com Profile
ProBallers.com Profile

1974 births
Living people
Al Riyadi Club Beirut basketball players
American expatriate basketball people in Cyprus
American expatriate basketball people in Greece
American expatriate basketball people in Jordan
American expatriate basketball people in Lebanon
American expatriate basketball people in North Macedonia
American men's basketball players
APOEL B.C. players
Arkansas Razorbacks men's basketball coaches
Arkansas Razorbacks men's basketball players
Arkansas RimRockers players
Basketball coaches from Louisiana
Basketball players from Louisiana
Competitors at the 1994 Goodwill Games
Dafnis B.C. players
Goodwill Games medalists in basketball
Keravnos B.C. players
Sagesse SC basketball players
Shooting guards
Shreveport Storm players
Sioux Falls Skyforce (CBA) players
Small forwards
Sportspeople from Ruston, Louisiana
Zain Club basketball players